Kenji Yoshino (born May 1, 1969) is a legal scholar and the Chief Justice Earl Warren Professor of Constitutional Law at New York University School of Law.  Formerly, he was the Guido Calabresi Professor of Law at Yale Law School. His work involves constitutional law, anti-discrimination law, civil and human rights, as well as law and literature, and Japanese law and society.

Education 
Yoshino graduated from Phillips Exeter Academy (1987) as valedictorian and Harvard College, obtaining a B.A. in English literature summa cum laude in 1991. Between undergraduate years, Yoshino worked as an aide for various members of the Japanese Parliament. He moved on to Magdalen College, Oxford as a Rhodes Scholar, earning a M.Sc. in management studies (industrial relations) in 1993. In 1996, he earned a J.D. from Yale Law School, where he was an editor of the Yale Law Journal.

Career 
From 1996 to 1997, Yoshino served as a law clerk for federal appellate judge Guido Calabresi of the U.S. Court of Appeals for the Second Circuit. In 1998, he received a tenure-track position at Yale Law School as an associate professor, and in 2003 the school bestowed a full professorship. In 2006, he was named the inaugural Guido Calabresi Professor of Law. Courts throughout the United States, including the U.S. Supreme Court, have referenced Yoshino's work.

His first book Covering: The Hidden Assault on Our Civil Rights was published in 2006. It is a mix of argument intertwined with pertinent biographical narratives. His second book, A Thousand Times More Fair: What Shakespeare's Plays Teach Us About Justice was published in 2011. In 2016, his book Speak Now: Marriage Equality on Trial was published and received the Stonewall Book Award's Israel Fishman Non-Fiction Award.

Covering won the Randy Shilts Award for Gay Non-Fiction from Publishing Triangle in 2007. His major areas of interest include social dynamics, conformity and assimilation, as well as queer (LGBT) and personal liberty issues. He has been a co-plaintiff in cases related to his specialties.

During the 2006-2007 and 2007-2008 school years, he served as a visiting professor at New York University School of Law, and in February 2008 he accepted a full-time tenured position as the Chief Justice Earl Warren Professor of Constitutional Law.

In May 2011, Yoshino was elected to the Harvard Board of Overseers, where he served a six-year term. In 2023, Kenji Yoshino joined the Facebook Oversight Board.

Personal life
A Japanese American, and openly gay man, Yoshino writes poetry for personal enjoyment.

Major works 
 (1996). "Suspect Symbols: The Literary Argument for Heightened Scrutiny for Gays". Columbia Law Review, 96 (1753).
 (1997). "The Lawyer of Belmont". Yale Journal of Law & the Humanities. 9 (183).
 (1998). "Assimilationist Bias in Equal Protection: The Visibility Presumption and the Case of 'Don’t Ask, Don’t Tell'". Yale Law Journal 108 (487).
 (2000). "The Epistemic Contract of Bisexual Erasure". Stanford Law Review, 52 (2).
 (2000). "The Eclectic Model of Censorship". California Law Review, 88 (5).
 (2002). "Covering". Yale Law Journal, 111 (769).
 (2005). "The City and the Poet" Yale Law Journal, 114 (1835).
 (2006). Covering: The Hidden Assault on Our Civil Rights. Random House. .
 (2011). "The New Equal Protection" Harvard Law Review, 124 (747).
 (2011).  A Thousand Times More Fair: What Shakespeare's Plays Teach Us About Justice. HarperCollins. .
 (2016). Speak Now:  Marriage Equality on Trial. Broadway Books. .
 (2023). Say the Right Thing: How to Talk About Diversity, Identity, and Justice. (with David Glasgow). Atria Books. .

See also 
 Joe Biden Supreme Court candidates

References

External links 
 NYU School of Law profile
 Personal website
 Yale Law profile

1969 births
Living people
Alumni of Magdalen College, Oxford
American academics of Japanese descent
American essayists
American gay writers
American legal scholars
American legal writers
American male essayists
American Rhodes Scholars
Gay academics
Harvard College alumni
Japanese-American civil rights activists
American LGBT people of Asian descent
American LGBT rights activists
New York University School of Law faculty
Phillips Exeter Academy alumni
Stonewall Book Award winners
Yale Law School alumni
Yale Law School faculty